Golden Touch is the third album released by Shabba Ranks.

The album was listed in the 1999 book The Rough Guide: Reggae: 100 Essential CDs.

Track listing

References

1991 albums
Shabba Ranks albums